The 2021 Tour of the Basque Country was a road cycling stage race that took place between 5 and 10 April 2021 in the titular region in northern Spain. It was the 60th edition of the Tour of the Basque Country and the 13th race of the 2021 UCI World Tour.

Teams 
All nineteen UCI WorldTeams and five UCI ProTeams participated in the race. Of these twenty-four teams, only , with six riders, did not field the maximum allowed of seven riders. From the 165 riders who started the race, 103 finished.

UCI WorldTeams

 
 
 
 
 
 
 
 
 
 
 
 
 
 
 
 
 
 
 

UCI ProTeams

Route 
The full route of the 2021 Tour of the Basque Country was announced on 26 February 2021.

Stages

Stage 1 
5 April 2021 — Bilbao to Bilbao, (ITT)

Stage 2 
6 April 2021 — Zalla to Sestao,

Stage 3 
7 April 2021 — Amurrio to Ermualde (Laudio),

Stage 4 
8 April 2021 — Gasteiz to Hondarribia,

Stage 5 
9 April 2021 — Hondarribia to Ondarroa,

Stage 6 
10 April 2021 — Ondarroa to Arrate (Eibar),

Classification leadership table 

 On stage 2, Jonas Vingegaard, who was third in the points classification, wore the green jersey, because first-placed Primož Roglič wore the yellow jersey as the leader of the general classification, and second-placed Brandon McNulty wore the blue jersey as the leader of the young rider classification.
 On stage 3, Alex Aranburu, who was second in the points classification, wore the green jersey, because first-placed Primož Roglič wore the yellow jersey as the leader of the general classification.
 On stage 4, Alex Aranburu, who was third in the points classification, wore the green jersey, because first-placed Primož Roglič wore the yellow jersey as the leader of the general classification, and second-placed Tadej Pogačar wore the polka-dot jersey as the leader of the mountains classification.
 On stage 4, Brandon McNulty, who was second in the young rider classification, wore the blue jersey, because first-placed Tadej Pogačar wore the polka-dot jersey as the leader of the mountains classification.
 On stages 5 and 6, Jonas Vingegaard, who was second in the young rider classification, wore the blue jersey, because first-placed Brandon McNulty wore the yellow jersey as the leader of the general classification.

Final classification standings

General classification

Points classification

Mountains classification

Young rider classification

Basque rider classification

Team classification

References

Sources

External links 

Tour of the Basque Country
Tour of the Basque Country
Tour of the Basque Country
2021
2021